The human immunodeficiency virus (HIV), which causes AIDS, varies in prevalence from nation to nation. Listed here are the prevalence rates among adults in various countries, based on data from various sources, largely the CIA World Factbook.

As of 2018, 38 million people are estimated infected with HIV globally.

The HIV pandemic is most severe in Southern Africa. Over 10% of all people infected with HIV/AIDS reside within the region. Adult HIV prevalence exceeds 15% in Eswatini, Botswana, and Lesotho, while an additional six countries report adult HIV prevalence of at least 10%. Outside Africa, the highest prevalence rate is found in the Bahamas (3.3%).

In absolute numbers, South Africa (7.5 million), followed by Mozambique (2.2 million), India (2.1 million) and Nigeria (1.8 million) had the highest HIV/AIDS number of cases by the end of 2022. While South Africa's large population of HIV-positive people is attributable to its high disease prevalence (17.3%, one of the highest in the world), Nigeria's is lower at 1.3%, with India's prevalence rate at 0.2%. However, countries such as Nigeria with high HIV rates above 1% are classified as having Generalized HIV Epidemics (GHEs) by UNAIDS, while India's prevalence is well below this threshold, with a prevalence lower than the US's and about the same as Spain.

HIV/AIDS prevalence estimates table

This data was sourced from the CIA's world factbook and UNAIDS AIDS info website unless referenced otherwise. A horizontal dash "-" indicates the data was not published. Adult prevalence describes ages between 15 and 49.

See also
 AIDS pandemic
By region:
 HIV/AIDS in Africa
 HIV/AIDS in Asia
 HIV/AIDS in Europe
 HIV/AIDS in North America
 HIV/AIDS in South America

References

Sources

External links
 HIV/AIDS Survey Indicators Database
 World Health Organization; Prevalence of HIV among adults aged 15 to 49 (%) by country
 World Health Organization; Number of deaths due to AIDS by country
 World Health Organization; Number of people (all ages) living with HIV by country

 
HIV AIDS adult prevalence rate
HIV AIDS adult prevalence rate